A is a service on the S-train network in Copenhagen. It is one of the base services on the network, running every 20 minutes from about 5:00 to 0:30 every day, and every 10 minutes from about 6:15 to 19:00. It runs between Hundige and Hillerød, serving all stations on the inner part of the Køge radial. During daytime on weekdays, every second train continues from Hundige station to Solrød Strand station. On Friday and Saturday nights there is also a 30 minutes service throughout the night.

History
Since the first part of the Køge radial opened in 1972, letter A has been used for the principal service on its inner part. Before that time the most constant characteristic of service A was that it ran on the Klampenborg radial in the northern end of the system.

Ax, K, A+

Until 2007, separate service designations were used for trains that reinforced the basic service on the Køge radial in high-traffic periods. This was in part because they had their own stopping patterns, and in part due to the then-current doctrine that a service letter such as A must not be used for more than exactly 3 trains an hour. The first supplementary service was the rush-hour Ax which started running when the first phase of the Køge radial opened in 1972. It was upgraded to the daytime K service in 1992 and quickly renamed to A+ in 1993.

References 

S-train (Copenhagen)